Sago with coconut milk is a Burmese and Thai dessert. The main components of this recipe are sago and coconut milk. The dish can be decorated with many toppings; including taro, sweet potato, coconut, yellow corn, banana, and others. It is similar to various forms of Vietnamese chè.

See also
 List of Thai desserts and snacks

References

External links

 

Thai desserts and snacks
Burmese desserts and snacks